Music for the Masses is an album by the band Depeche Mode.

Music for the Masses may also refer to:
Music for the Masses (quiz night), a quiz night in Hobart, Tasmania, Australia now known as Music for the Mission
Music for the Masses (Lawrence music festival), a music festival in Lawrence, Kansas